Giorgos Zacharopoulos (born 13 December 1971) is a Greek former professional footballer.

References

1971 births
Living people
Ethnikos Asteras F.C. players
Panetolikos F.C. players
Kallithea F.C. players
Chalkidona F.C. players
Atromitos F.C. players
A.O. Kerkyra players
Fostiras F.C. players
Enosi Panaspropyrgiakou Doxas players
Vyzas F.C. players
Thrasyvoulos F.C. players
Apollon Smyrnis F.C. players
Panelefsiniakos F.C. players
Proodeftiki F.C. players
Super League Greece players
Super League Greece 2 players
Association football forwards
Footballers from Athens
Greek footballers